Robert Criswell may refer to:

Robert W. Criswell (1850–1905), American humorist and newspaperman
 Robert Criswell, author of "Uncle Tom's Cabin" Contrasted with Buckingham Hall, the Planter's Home (1852)